Samir Doughty (born January 2, 1997) is an American professional basketball player. He played college basketball for the VCU Rams and the Auburn Tigers.

High school career
Doughty attended Mathematics, Civics and Sciences Charter School in Philadelphia, Pennsylvania. In middle school, he played for the Philly Pride AAU team. Doughty was a two-time first-team all-league selection in high school and led the Mighty Elephants to back-to-back appearances in the league playoffs. He averaged 16.8 points per game as a junior. As a senior, Doughty averaged 24.9 points per game. Doughty originally committed to St. John's out of high school.

College career
Doughty redshirted his freshman season at VCU. He had a season-high 23 points to go with nine assists and seven rebounds against Duquesne. Doughty scored 17 points in the Atlantic 10 Conference Tournament against Richmond. He helped the Rams reach the NCAA Tournament, where they lost to St. Mary's in a game in which Doughty scored nine points. As a redshirt freshman, Doughty averaged 9.0 points, 3.6 rebounds and 2.1 assists per game, shooting 40.9 percent from the floor and 28.4 percent from three-point range. After the season, he decided to transfer to Auburn after coach Will Wade left to become the coach of LSU. In Auburn's trip to Italy, Doughty averaged 6.0 points, 3.7 rebounds, 3.3 steals and 2.0 assists per game. After sitting out a season, he helped lead Auburn to the Final Four. In the Final Four matchup against Virginia, Doughty scored 13 points but fouled Kyle Guy with 0.6 seconds remaining in a 63–62 loss. Doughty was the Tigers’ top three-point shooter at 42.5 percent as a junior while averaging 7.3 points and 3.5 rebounds per game. 

Doughty scored a career-high 33 points in a 116–70 win over Cal State Northridge on November 15, 2019. On February 4, Doughty scored 23 points and hit two clinching free throws in a 79–76 overtime win at Arkansas, despite having a virus and not practicing.

At the end of the regular season in his senior year, Doughty was named to the All-SEC First Team by the coaches and the All-SEC Second Team by the Associated Press. Doughty averaged a team-leading 16.7 points, 3.9 rebounds and 2.7 assists per game during a 25–6 season.

Professional career
Doughty was selected with the 22nd pick in the 2021 NBA G League draft by the Iowa Wolves. He was subsequently traded to the Lakeland Magic. He appeared in 17 games for the Magic, averaging 8.1 points, 3.7 rebounds and 2.0 assists, before being waived on January 31, 2022. 

Doughty was acquired by the Fort Wayne Mad Ants on February 14, but waived on February 24.

Career statistics

College

|-
| style="text-align:left;"| 2015–16
| style="text-align:left;"| VCU
| style="text-align:center;" colspan="11"|  Redshirt
|-
| style="text-align:left;"| 2016–17
| style="text-align:left;"| VCU
| 35 || 15 || 23.2 || .409 || .284 || .766 || 3.6 || 2.1 || .9 || .1 || 9.0
|-
| style="text-align:left;"| 2018–19
| style="text-align:left;"| Auburn
| style="background:#cfecec;"| 40* || 27 || 24.2 || .458 || .425 || .785 || 3.5 || 1.7 || 1.4 || .1 || 7.3
|-
| style="text-align:left;"| 2019–20
| style="text-align:left;"| Auburn
| 31 || 31 || 33.3 || .412 || .335 || .767 || 3.9 || 2.7 || 1.2 || .1 || 16.7
|- class="sortbottom"
| style="text-align:center;" colspan="2"| Career
| 106 || 73 || 26.5 || .423 || .350 || .770 || 3.6 || 2.1 || 1.2 || .1 || 10.6

References

External links
Auburn Tigers bio
VCU Rams bio

1997 births
Living people
American men's basketball players
Auburn Tigers men's basketball players
Basketball players from Philadelphia
Lakeland Magic players
Point guards
Shooting guards
VCU Rams men's basketball players